Sardar Khalid Mahmood Warun is a Pakistani politician who was a Member of the Provincial Assembly of the Punjab, from 2002 to 2007 and again from May 2013 to May 2018.

Early life and education
He was born on 1 January 1970 in Bahawalpur.

He has graduated from University of the Punjab.

Political career
He was elected to the Provincial Assembly of Punjab as a candidate of Pakistan Peoples Party from Constituency PP-269 (Bahawalpur-III) in 2002 Pakistani general election. He received 34,122 votes and defeated a candidate of Pakistan Muslim League (Q) (PML-Q).

He ran for the seat of the Provincial Assembly of Punjab as a candidate of PML-Q from Constituency PP-269 (Bahawalpur-III) in 2008 Pakistani general election but was unsuccessful. He received 22,484 votes and lost the seat to Malik Jehan Zeb Warun, an independent candidate.

He was re-elected to the Provincial Assembly of the Punjab as a candidate of Pakistan Muslim League (N) from Constituency PP-269 (Bahawalpur-III) in 2013 Pakistani general election.

References

Living people
Punjab MPAs 2013–2018
Punjab MPAs 2002–2007
1970 births
Pakistan Muslim League (N) politicians
University of the Punjab alumni
People from Bahawalpur